Septèmes-les-Vallons is a commune in the Bouches-du-Rhône department in southern France. It is located 10.7 km (6.5 mi) north from the centre of Marseille.

Population

See also
Communes of the Bouches-du-Rhône department

References

Communes of Bouches-du-Rhône
Bouches-du-Rhône communes articles needing translation from French Wikipedia